Eversion (from the verb evert) is the process of turning inside-out. Eversion may refer to:

 Eversion (kinesiology), the anatomical term of motion denoting the movement of the sole of the foot away from the median plane
 Eversion (video game), a 2010 platform video game by Guilherme S. Tows
 In sea cucumbers, a form of autotomy in which the animal ejects its internal organs as a defensive strategy
 Stomach eversion in starfish, where prey is digested externally through an inside-out stomach, usually into a bivalve.
 Sphere eversion, the mathematical process of smoothly turning a sphere inside out
 Eversion (novel), a novel by Alastair Reynolds published on 26th May 2022

See also
Everts (disambiguation)
Inversion (disambiguation)
 Inside Out (disambiguation)